Clifton Burton "Coo Coo" Marlin (January 3, 1932 – August 14, 2005) was a NASCAR Winston Cup driver who spent 14 years in the series.

Local track history
Marlin earned a name for himself at the short tracks in Tennessee and Alabama, running against Red Farmer, Bobby Allison, and Donnie Allison. He was a four-time track champion at Nashville Speedway USA (now Music City Motorplex).

Marlin was a speedway favorite with a lot of kids during the 1960s. He drove a fire-engine red 1964 Chevrolet Impala, No. 711, and was the first real "hero" to many youngsters. During this time, he and his racing "nemesis," Charlie Binkley No. 125, continuously thrilled audiences with their often tense finishes. Marlin was always available for photos and autographs in the pits after a race. His brother, Jack Marlin, was also a crowd favorite.

Grand National and Winston Cup career
Marlin advanced to part-time rides on the NASCAR Grand National circuit, starting with one race in 1966 and three in 1967. He ran more of the schedule as the series changed from Grand National to Winston Cup, but he never competed in more than 23 races in any season. He never won a race in his 165 Winston Cup starts from 1966 to 1980, but he had nine top 5 and 51 top 10 finishes, with many of those starts in a car numbered 14.  However, in 1973, Marlin won a non points race, with one of the Duel races at Daytona that year.

Death
Marlin died in his hometown of Columbia, Tennessee on August 14, 2005 of lung cancer at the age of 73.

Son's use of number 14 as memorial

Shortly after Marlin's death, his son Sterling was in negotiations with MB2 Motorsports to drive the team's second car for 2006. The team was unable to retain the No. 10 (which was to be used by Evernham Motorsports for 2006), so MB2 was looking for a new number. A still-grieving Sterling found the No. 14 available (ppc Racing's defunct Nextel Cup team had been the last to use it) and had MB2 request the No. 14, which was granted. It was run to honor his father during his year and a half with the team until his unexpected release from Ginn Racing mid-way through the 2007 season, after the team merged with Dale Earnhardt, Inc. The No. 14 is now run by Chase Briscoe, his owner and former driver Tony Stewart who chose the number for his own race team in honor of AJ Foyt, a childhood hero of his.

Motorsports career results

NASCAR
(key) (Bold – Pole position awarded by qualifying time. Italics – Pole position earned by points standings or practice time. * – Most laps led.)

Grand National Series

Winston Cup Series

Daytona 500

References

External links 
ESPN Obituary

1932 births
2005 deaths
Deaths from lung cancer
NASCAR drivers
People from Columbia, Tennessee
Deaths from cancer in Tennessee
Racing drivers from Tennessee